Denis Braccini is a French actor.

Career 
In films, Denis Braccini plays in action movies (by Luc Besson, Florent Emilio Siri, Bob Swaim...) and intimate movies (by Christine Carrière, Laurent Tuel).

On television, he appears in many series and was the commissaire Thomas Quilichini in Mafiosa with Hélène Fillières and Thierry Neuvic.

Filmography

Actor

Film 

1995: Le videur (by Christophe Jacrot) (Short)
1997: Didier (by Alain Chabat) - Le type parc public
1997: Bouge ! (by Jérôme Cornuau) - Vigile 1
1997: K (by Alexandre Arcady) - Un policier à l'hôpital
1998: Taxi (by Luc Besson) - Chef Pompier
1998: J'aimerais pas crever un dimanche (by Didier Le Pêcheur) - Le patron de la pizzeria
1998: Bimboland (by Ariel Zeitoun) - Videur boîte de nuit
1999: Le Derrière (by Valérie Lemercier) - Le cuirman du Victory
1999: Qui plume la lune ? (by Christine Carrière) - Le Prof de Gym
2001: Les Morsures de l'aube (by Antoine de Caunes) - TBM 1
2001: Yamakasi (by Ariel Zeitoun)
2002: The Nest (by Florent Emilio Siri) - Le pompier
2002: The Bourne Identity (by Doug Liman) - Picot
2002: Peau d'Ange (by Vincent Pérez)
2002: La vie promise (by Olivier Dahan) - Policier en civil
2003: Bloody Pizza (by Michel Rodas) (Short)
2003: Lovely Rita, sainte patronne des cas désespérés (by Stéphane Clavier) - Hervé Baldini
2004: Nos amis les flics (by Bob Swaim) - Le patron du Mistral
2006: Jean-Philippe (by Laurent Tuel) - Jean-Paul
2007: Darling (by Christine Carrière) - Médecin du travail
2007: The Easy Way (by Jean-Paul Rouve) - Le truand #2
2008: Transporter 3 (by Olivier Megaton) - Custom Officer #1
2009: District 13: Ultimatum (by Patrick Alessandrin) - Homme de main waiter 1
2010: Gauche droite (by Stéphane Bouquet) (Short) - le Coach
2010: 22 Bullets (by Richard Berry) - Le Boumian
2011: Forces spéciales (by Stéphane Rybojad) - Criminel de Guerre Serbe
2013: Douce nuit (by Stéphane Bouquet) (Short) - Grand
2014: Colt 45 (by Fabrice du Welz) - Nicolaï

Television 
1999: Tramontane - Maury
2001: Avocats et Associés - Le gardien de prison de Franck
2004: Les Cordier, juge et flic - Convoyeur
2004: La Nourrice (by Renaud Bertrand) (TV Movie) - Père Madeleine
2004: B.R.I.G.A.D. - Le Capitaine des gendarmes
2004: Père et Maire - Gilles Leperche
2006: L'État de Grace - Garde du corps 1
2007: The Murder of Princess Diana (TV Movie) - Henri Paul
2007: Sur le fil - Rieux
2007: Sauveur Giordano - Sbire 1
2007-2012: Fais pas ci, fais pas ça - Monsieur Azemar / Homme
2008: Femmes de loi - Responsable 707
2008: Elles et Moi (by Bernard Stora)
2008: R.I.S, police scientifique - L'agent de contrôle
2009: L'École du pouvoir (by Raoul Peck) (TV Movie) - Leader paysan
2009: Aveugle mais pas trop (by Charlotte Brandstrom) (TV Movie) - Le chauffeur de camion 1
2010: Mes amis, mes amours, mes emmerdes... - Le gardien de nuit
2010: La Cour des grands (TV Movie) - Le chauffeur de camion 1
2010: Marion Mazzano - Charpentier
2010-2014: Mafiosa - Thomas Quilichini
2011: Un flic - Ange Marachini
2013: Crossing Lines - Jacques

Screenwriter 
2005: La Jeune femme qui lisait des romans d'amour, Régis Mardon, short

Theatre 
1993-1994: Woyzeck by Georg Büchner, dir Jean-Pierre Vincent - Théâtre de Nîmes, Théâtre du Rond-Point
1994: Cinq minutes pas plus by and dir Jean-Christophe Barc
1995: Turcaretby Alain-René Lesage, dir Eric Fauveau - Théâtre Montmartre-Galabru
1997: Attentif ensemble by François Rivière, dir Daniel Lucarini

References

External links 
 

Living people
French male film actors
French male television actors
Place of birth missing (living people)
Year of birth missing (living people)